Thomas Strange (died 1594) was the member of Parliament for the English constituency of Cirencester for the parliament of 1572.

References 

English MPs 1572–1583
Members of the Parliament of England for Cirencester
1594 deaths
Year of birth unknown
16th-century English farmers